His Majesty's Marshal of the Realm who heads the Office of the Marshal of the Realm, is the highest official in the Royal Court of Sweden. The Marshal of the Realm is appointed by the monarch and is directly responsible for the organization and affairs of the court, and for maintaining liaison arrangements with the Riksdag and the Prime Minister/Government. Press releases and official statements from the Swedish Royal Family to the press and the public are typically released through the Marshal of the Realm.

The office was created in 1607 during the reign of Charles IX, and until 1936 during the reign of Gustaf V, with the appointment of Axel Vennersten, it had always been held by a member of the Swedish nobility. The incumbent is in formal writing entitled to the style of Excellency, and is today, apart from Swedish ambassadors, the only officeholder to use this style. Until the 1970s, the Prime Minister and the Minister of Foreign Affairs also used this style, but it has since fallen out of use. The Marshals of the Realm were also in the past, until the reform of the state orders of chivalry in 1975, appointed as Knights of the Royal Order of the Seraphim, but since then Swedish citizens other than members of the Royal House are no longer eligible.

The present officeholder, Fredrik Wersäll, was appointed in 2018.

List of Marshals of the Realm since 1607

See also
Lesser Officers of the Realm
Governor of Stockholm
Reichsmarschall

References

External links

1607 introductions
Swedish court titles
Swedish monarchy